Ethiopian Airlines Flight 708 was a Boeing 720-060B, due to operate an international scheduled Addis Ababa–Asmara–Athens–Rome–Paris passenger service, that experienced a hijacking attempt on 8 December 1972.

Summary
A hand grenade that was armed by one of the hijackers was rolled down the aisle by a passenger. Despite this, the crew turned back the airplane to the airport of origin and managed to land it safely; it sustained minor damages that were repaired later.

Security guards —there were six of them aboard— opened fire at the terrorists, killing six of the hijackers on board, while the seventh one died in a hospital.

See also

Ethiopian Airlines accidents and incidents
List of aircraft hijackings

Footnotes

Notes

References

708
Terrorist incidents in Africa in 1972
Aircraft hijackings
Aviation accidents and incidents in Ethiopia
1972 in Ethiopia
December 1972 events in Africa
Terrorist incidents in Ethiopia
Terrorist incidents in Ethiopia in the 1970s
Aircraft hijackings in Africa
Accidents and incidents involving the Boeing 707
Eritrean War of Independence
1972 disasters in Ethiopia